Rovensky Uyezd (Ровенский уезд) was one of the subdivisions of the Volhynian Governorate of the Russian Empire. It was situated in the northern part of the governorate. Its administrative centre was Rivne.

Demographics
At the time of the Russian Empire Census of 1897, Rovensky Uyezd had a population of 273,001. Of these, 60.5% spoke Ukrainian, 16.0% Yiddish, 9.2% Polish, 8.9% German, 3.2% Russian, 1.7% Czech, 0.3% Belarusian and 0.1% Tatar as their native language.

References

 
Uezds of Volhynian Governorate
Volhynian Governorate